The Khazar Islands , also known as Caspian Islands, is a stalled development of artificial islands 25 km (16 mi) south of Baku, Azerbaijan consisting of 41 islands extending  into the Caspian Sea.

The Plan 

The stated plan was for $100 billion, with $30 billion coming from foreign investors and another $30 billion from apartment sales, the city aiming to house 1 million residents in a development with 150 schools, 50 hospitals and daycare centers, numerous parks, shopping malls, cultural centers and a university campus plus a Formula 1 quality racetrack around a centrepiece $2 billion  Azerbaijan Tower (planned to have been the tallest in the world). The city was expected to be equipped with 150 bridges and a large municipal airport to connect the islands to the mainland. It is expected that, in general, the city, when completed in 2022–2023, will host 1 million residents. According to the project, the price of completely renovated apartments will be around $4000–$5000 per square meter. 

All of these facilities were to be able to withstand up to magnitude 9.0 earthquakes. 
The president of the controlling Avesta Group of Companies, Ibrahim Ibrahimov, reportedly had the original idea in a flash while flying between Baku and Dubai. He told reporters that American, Turkish, Arab and Chinese investors had showed interest in the project which he described as being like a "new Venice".

Construction and demise 

Construction on Khazar Islands began in March 2011 and substantial building works were achieved during Azerbaijan's economic boom. In August 2014, the main beach area was opened with a fanfare with many sky-scraper buildings already part constructed. However, the project's gigantic scale and overly ambitious design became more obvious in 2015 as the oil price crashed. Between May 12 and May 27, 2015 Ibrahimov was arrested due to his company's inability to start repayment of his/Avesta's debt to the International Bank of Azerbaijan, a debt then reckoned to be around US$57 million. After Ibrahimov's release, company statements later insisted that the project was still scheduled to be completed between 2020 and 2025 with investors from China cited as keen to fill the funding gap. In an April 2017 interview, Ibrahimov insisted that long-delayed works would finally restart later that year. In October 2017 Ibrahimov was reported to have restarted his work with Avesta and declared that he would not leave Azerbaijan but raised doubts as to the continuation of the Khazar Islands project  and as of January 2018, there is little sign of any work resuming.

See also
 List of artificial islands
 Azerbaijan Tower

References

Further reading

External links
 Khazar Islands Homepage
 Avesta Concern Homepage

Artificial islands of Asia
Islands of Azerbaijan
Political controversies in Azerbaijan